AOL TV was the name of both a thin client which uses a television for display (rather than a monitor), and the online service that supports it, both of which were launched in June 2000 to compete with WebTV.

The product and service were developed by America Online. While most thin clients developed in the mid-1990s were positioned as diskless workstations for corporate intranets, AOL TV was positioned as a consumer device for web access. Since the device was a dedicated web browser appliance, the cost of licensing a proprietary operating system could be avoided. For inexpensive devices, the cost of licensing a proprietary operating system is substantial.

The set top box for AOL TV was developed by NCI/Liberate using a thin client and manufactured by Philips.

AOL TV discontinued sales in November 2002, although the service remained available to existing subscribers for a time.  The service is no longer supported by AOL and the documentation has been removed from their servers.

References

Interactive television
Streaming television
Telecommunications companies established in 2000
Internet properties established in 2000
Companies disestablished in 2002
AOL